The National Electoral Council is the highest electoral authority, both at the administrative and jurisdictional level in the Republic of Honduras. It was created through constitutional reforms in January 2019, supplanting the previous Supreme Electoral Tribunal.

The Council alongside the Electoral Justice Tribunal deal with everything related to electoral acts and procedures. Integration, organization and operation are governed by the precepts of the Constitution of Honduras and the Electoral and Political Organizations.

Budget 

Insufficient requires of a budget of 700,0000 Lempiras, but only were assigned to it 400 million, but part of this budget has to pay the debt of 125 million purchased during the general elections of 2013, with these actions the government would be undermining Honduras democratic system, since the 2017 primary elections will have a cost of 1,100 million.

See also

 Elections in Honduras
 Primary elections in Honduras
 Politics of Honduras
 Legal history in Honduras
 Government of Honduras
 Supreme Court of Honduras
 National Congress of Honduras
 Constitution of Honduras
 Public Prosecutor's Office (Honduras)
 Executive branch of the government of Honduras
 President of Honduras

References

External links
Official website

Elections in Honduras
Honduras